Tandjilé may refer to:
 Tandjilé Prefecture, one of the 14 Prefectures of Chad, which existed from 1960, the year of independence, to 1999
 Tandjilé Region, one of the regions of Chad, established in 2002